The following directory lists and provides links to articles about the Troubles.

Main articles

General
Murals in Northern Ireland
Operation Banner
Provisional IRA campaign 1969–1997
Segregation in Northern Ireland
Parades in Northern Ireland
The Troubles in Derry

Timelines
Timeline of the Northern Ireland Troubles (1966–1998)
Timeline of the Troubles in the Republic of Ireland (1969–1998) 
Timeline of the Northern Ireland Troubles in Britain (1969–1997)
List of bombings during the Northern Ireland Troubles (1969–1998)

of republican actions
Timeline of Provisional Irish Republican Army actions (1970–1997)
Timeline of Irish National Liberation Army actions (1975–1999)
Timeline of Continuity Irish Republican Army actions (1994–present)
Timeline of Real Irish Republican Army actions (1997–present)
Timeline of Óglaigh na hÉireann actions (2006–present)
Timeline of Irish People's Liberation Organisation actions (1986–1992)
Timeline of Official Irish Republican Army actions (1969–1972)

of loyalist actions
Timeline of Ulster Volunteer Force actions (1966–1994)
Timeline of Ulster Defence Association actions (1971–1994, 1997–1998)
Timeline of Loyalist Volunteer Force actions (1996–2000)
Timeline of Red Hand Commando actions (1973–1994)
Timeline of Orange Volunteer Force actions (1998–2009)

Paramilitaries
Laws in both the Republic of Ireland and the UK proscribe (ban) membership of a number of Irish republican and Ulster loyalist groups.  Several other smaller paramilitary factions have appeared throughout the Troubles, and some groups have used cover-names to deflect responsibility for attacks.

In this context, operational refers to the period during which the 'official' paramilitary campaign was conducted.

Republicans

Umbrella groups
Irish Republican Socialist Movement
Provisional Republican Movement

Loyalists

Umbrella groups
Ulster Army Council (UAC)
Ulster Loyalist Central Co-ordinating Committee (ULCCC)
Combined Loyalist Military Command (CLMC)

Cover names used by paramilitaries
 Protestant Action Force - Used by the UVF to claim sectarian attacks.
 South Armagh Republican Action Force - Used by the PIRA's South Armagh Brigade to claim sectarian attacks in the mid-1970s
 Catholic Reaction Force - Used by the INLA to claim sectarian attacks.
 Armagh People's Republican Army & People's Liberation Army - was used by the INLA to claim some of their earliest attacks, mostly in 1975.
 Ulster Freedom Fighters - Used by the UDA to claim violent attacks.
 Red Hand Brigade - Was used as a cover by the Glenanne gang members who carried out the Dublin and Monaghan bombings in May 1974.

Periods of activity
In the table below:
The period of activity for republican groups is shown in green.
The period of activity for loyalist groups is shown in orange.
The period of ceasefire is shown in grey.

State security forces

United Kingdom
British Army
Territorial Army
Force Research Unit
Royal Air Force
Royal Navy
Metropolitan Police
MI5
GCHQ
Secret Intelligence Service

Northern Ireland
Royal Ulster Constabulary (RUC)
RUC Special Branch
Ulster Special Constabulary (USC) – to 30 April 1970
Northern Ireland Prison Service (NIPS)
Ulster Defence Regiment (UDR) – from 1 January 1970 to 30 June 1992
Royal Irish Regiment (RIR) – from 1 July 1992

Republic of Ireland
Irish Army
Garda Síochána (police)

Political parties
Listing includes brief summary of ideology and position on the Good Friday Agreement 1998.

Irish nationalist

Pro-Agreement
Sinn Féin (SF). President: Gerry Adams. Militant nationalist. Associated with the Provisional IRA. Translation from Irish: "We Ourselves".
The Social Democratic and Labour Party (SDLP). Leader: Colum Eastwood. Moderate centre-left nationalist.
The Workers' Party (WP). President: Mick Finnegan. Marxist nationalist. Formerly Official Sinn Féin.

Anti-Agreement
The Irish Republican Socialist Party (IRSP). Militant socialist nationalist. Political wing of INLA. Have been on ceasefire since 1998.
Republican Sinn Féin (RSF). President: Des Dalton. Militant nationalist. Associated with the Continuity IRA.
The 32 County Sovereignty Movement (32CSM). President: Francis Mackey. Militant nationalist. Associated with the Real IRA.
The Republican Network for Unity (RNU). Militant nationalist. Accused by Police Service of Northern Ireland (PSNI) of being the political wing of Óglaigh na hÉireann (Real IRA splinter group), however this is rejected by both groups.

Others 
 Fianna Fáil
 Fine Gael
 Green Party
 Renua Ireland

Unionist

Pro-Agreement
The Democratic Unionist Party (DUP). Leader: Peter Robinson. Radical populist unionist. Originally anti-Agreement.
The Ulster Unionist Party (UUP). Leader: Tom Elliott. Moderate conservative unionist.
The Progressive Unionist Party (PUP). Leader: Billy Hutchinson. Moderate centre-left unionist. Political wing of Ulster Volunteer Force.
The Conservative Party also organises and contests elections in Northern Ireland. Moderate unionist.

Anti-Agreement
Traditional Unionist Voice (TUV). Leader: Jim Allister. Old school loyalist.

Other
The Alliance Party of Northern Ireland. Leader: David Ford. Liberal cross-community. Pro-Agreement
The Green Party. Environmentalist. Pro-Agreement.
Ulster Third Way. Supports Northern Ireland independence.

Political structures

Northern Ireland government
1921-1972
Governor
Prime Minister
Cabinet

1998-
First Minister and deputy First Minister
Executive

Northern Ireland legislatures
1921-1972

The Parliament of Northern Ireland:

House of Commons
Senate

1972-1998
The Northern Ireland Assembly (1973–1974)
The Northern Ireland Constitutional Convention (1975–1976)
The Northern Ireland Assembly (1982–1986)
The Northern Ireland Forum (1996–1998)

1998-
The Northern Ireland Assembly

Republic of Ireland government
Taoiseach (prime minister)
Department of Defence
Department of Foreign Affairs
Dáil Éireann (assembly)
Seanad Éireann (senate)

United Kingdom government
Prime Minister
The Ministry of Defence (MOD)
The Northern Ireland Office (NIO)
The House of Commons
The House of Lords
The Northern Ireland Affairs Committee (House of Commons)
The Northern Ireland Grand Committee (House of Commons)

Peace process

Co-operative bodies
British-Irish Council (BIC)
British-Irish Inter-Parliamentary Body
North/South Ministerial Council (NSMC)

Key steps in the peace process
Sunningdale Agreement (1973)
Anglo-Irish Agreement (1985)
Downing Street Declaration (1993) and principle of consent
Establishment of the IICD (1997)
Belfast Agreement (1998)
Amendment of Articles 2 and 3 (1999)
Establishment of the Independent Monitoring Commission (2003)
IRA ceasefire and decommissioning (2005)
St Andrews Agreement (2006)

Cultural and religious organisations

Religious
Roman Catholic Church in Ireland
Church of Ireland (Anglican)
Presbyterian Church in Ireland
Methodist Church in Ireland
Free Presbyterian Church of Ulster

Sporting
The Gaelic Athletic Association (GAA)

Politico-religious fraternal organisations

Unionist/Protestant
The Apprentice Boys of Derry
The Orange Institution
The Independent Orange Order
The Royal Black Institution

Nationalist/Catholic
The Ancient Order of Hibernians (AOH)

References

Christianity in Northern Ireland
Government of Northern Ireland
Politics of Northern Ireland
The Troubles (Northern Ireland)
Troubles
Outlines of history and events